Heterorhabditis bacteriophora is a species of entomopathogenic nematode known commonly as beneficial nematodes. They are microscopic and are used in gardening as a form of biological pest control. They are used to control ants, fleas, moths, beetles, flies, weevils, and other pests.

These beneficial nematodes enter target insect larva via mouth, anus or respiratory openings and starts to feed.  To reproduce the nematodes release Photorhabdus bacteria from their digestive tract.  The bacteria rapidly multiply in the target insect larva and kills it. The nematodes then use the larva cadaver to grow and reproduce.

Biological Systems Research

These nematodes are amenable to in vitro culture, making them of interest to evolutionary and molecular biologists who investigate parasitic and symbiotic systems. Heterorhabditis bacteriophora was selected by the National Human Genome Research Institute as a sequencing target.  The inbred strain H. bacteriophora TTO1 was sequenced using Roche 454 technology, and a high-quality 77 Mb draft genome assembly was produced in 2013.

References

External links 
 

Rhabditida
Biological control agents of pest insects
Nematodes described in 1976
Taxa named by George Poinar Jr.